Rudinei Amâncio (born 5 March 1975) is a former Brazilian footballer. He played professionally in both Brazil and China, most notably for Criciúma in 1995.

Career statistics

Club

Notes

References

1975 births
Living people
Brazilian footballers
Brazilian expatriate footballers
Association football forwards
Joinville Esporte Clube players
Club Athletico Paranaense players
Criciúma Esporte Clube players
Sociedade Esportiva Recreativa e Cultural Brasil players
Henan Songshan Longmen F.C. players
Campeonato Brasileiro Série A players
Brazilian expatriate sportspeople in China
Expatriate footballers in China